Booth House may refer to:

in Australia
Booth House, Sydney, Bridge Street, Sydney, example of Functionalism (architecture)

in Canada
Booth House (Ottawa)

in the United States (by state)
Booth-Weir House, McRae, Arkansas, listed on the National Register of Historic Places (NRHP) in White County, Arkansas
Green Booth House, Searcy, Arkansas, listed on the NRHP in White County
Kerr-Booth House, Searcy, Arkansas, listed on the NRHP in White County
Call-Booth House, Robles, California, listed on the NRHP in San Luis Obispo County
Nathan B. Booth House, Stratford, Connecticut, NRHP-listed, in Fairfield County
Boothe Homestead, Stratford, Connecticut, NRHP-listed, in Fairfield County
Frank Booth House, Lewiston, Idaho, listed on the NRHP in Nez Perce County
Booth-Dunham Estate, Texas Charter Township, Michigan, listed on the NRHP in Kalamazoo County
Bradshaw-Booth House, Enterprise, Mississippi, listed on the NRHP in Clarke County
Booth House (Bedford, New York), modern house designed by Philip Johnson
Evangeline Booth House, Hartsdale, New York, listed on the NRHP in Westchester County
Booth Homestead, Guernsey, Ohio, NRHP-listed, in Guernsey County
Dr. J. C. Booth House, Lebanon, Oregon, listed on the NRHP in Linn County
Booth Farm, Boothwyn, Pennsylvania, NRHP-listed, in Delaware County
Edwin Robert Booth House, Nephi, Utah, listed on the NRHP in Juab County
Oscar M. Booth House, Nephi, Utah, listed on the NRHP in Juab County
Clinger-Booth House, Orem, Utah, listed on the NRHP in Utah County
John E. Booth House, Provo, Utah, listed on the NRHP in Utah County
Booth-Parsons House, Salt Lake City, Utah, listed on the NRHP in Salt Lake County
Booth-Lovelace House, Hardy, Virginia, listed on the NRHP in Franklin County
Booth Cooperage, Bayfield, Wisconsin, listed on the NRHP in Bayfield County
J. C. Booth House, Saylesville, Wisconsin, listed on the NRHP in Waukesha County

See also
Booth Hotel, Independence, Kansas, listed on the NRHP in Montgomery County, Kansas
Booth Theater (Independence, Kansas), NRHP-listed
Booth Site, Mayetta, Kansas, NRHP-listed, listed on the NRHP in Jackson County, Kansas
Booth Post No. 130-Grand Army of the Republic Hall, Grand Meadow, Minnesota, NRHP-listed, in Mower County
O. H. Booth Hose Company, Poughkeepsie, New York, NRHP-listed